Anilio (Greek: Ανήλιο, meaning without sun) is a settlement in Zacharo municipality in western Elis, Peloponnese, Greece.

See also
List of settlements in Elis

References

Populated places in Elis